William Gale Vinton (November 17, 1947 – October 4, 2018) was an American animator and filmmaker. Vinton was best known for his Claymation work, alongside creating iconic characters such as The California Raisins. He won an Oscar for his work alongside several Emmy Awards and Clio Awards for his studio's work.

Life and education
Vinton was born on November 17, 1947, to a car dealer father and a bookkeeper mother in McMinnville, Oregon.

During the 1960s, Vinton studied physics, architecture and filmmaking at the University of California, Berkeley, where he was influenced by the work of Antoni Gaudí. During this time, Vinton made a black-and-white feature-length documentary film about the California counter-culture movement titled Gone for a Better Deal, which toured college campuses in various film festivals of the time.  Two more films about student protest followed, Berkeley Games and First Ten Days, as well a narrative short Reply, and his first animation, Culture Shock.

Vinton received his bachelor's degree in architecture from UC Berkeley in 1970.

Career

Collaboration with Bob Gardiner
Meeting clay animator Bob Gardiner in the Berkeley, California, area in the early 1970s, Vinton brought him to Portland and they commandeered Vinton's home basement to make a quick 1½-minute test film of clay animation (and the supporting armatures) called Wobbly Wino, completed in early 1973. Gardiner refined his sculpting and animation techniques while Vinton built a system for animating his Bolex Rex-5 16mm camera and they began work in mid-1973 on an 8-minute 16mm short film about a drunk wino who stumbles into a closed art museum and interacts with the paintings and sculptures. Completed in late 1974 after 14 months of production, the film combined Gardiner's sculpting skills and comedy writing talent with Vinton's camera skills. Closed Mondays won an Academy Award for Best Animated Short Film in the spring of 1975, the first film produced in Portland to do so.

Vinton and Gardiner parted ways during the production of their second short film, Mountain Music completed by Vinton in 1976. Gardiner focused on producing PSA spots for local political issues (eventually evolving into other artistic media such as music and holograms) while Vinton established Will Vinton Productions (later Will Vinton Studios) in Portland to capitalize on the animation technology Gardiner had developed for their animated short Closed Mondays. Quickly expanding his studio by hiring new animators, Vinton produced dozens of commercials for regional and then national companies.

Will Vinton Studios

Going solo
Still with only a handful of animators, Vinton produced a trilogy of 27-minute fairy tales in the late 1970s and early 1980s, Martin the Cobbler (1977), the Oscar-nominated Rip Van Winkle (1978), and The Little Prince (1979). These films were later released theatrically under the umbrella title Trilogy, and later to video as The Little Prince and Friends. In 1978, Vinton produced the documentary Claymation: Three Dimensional Clay Animation a 17-minute film featuring the behind-the-scenes technical processes used. The term "claymation" was later trademarked by Vinton, and has become synonymous with clay animation in general.

35mm years
Graduating to 35mm film, Vinton produced other short films during this time: Legacy (1979), Dinosaur (1980), The Creation (directed by Joan Gratz, 1981, Oscar nominated), The Great Cognito (directed by Barry Bruce, 1982, Oscar nominated), A Christmas Gift, and the music video Vanz Kant Danz (1987) for Creedence Clearwater Revival's John Fogerty.  VHS video compilations of these films were released in the 1980s as Festival of Claymation and Son of Combo II.

Vinton, no longer performing animation himself, later produced special effects scenes for TV shows and movies, including a sequence for Bette Midler's Divine Madness! movie (1980), an Emmy-winning sequence for the Moonlighting TV series (1987), and the opening & closing title sequences for the feature comedy film Brain Donors (1992). His company's animation effects for Disney's Return to Oz (1985) were also nominated for a special effects Oscar. In May 1985, Will Vinton Productions released their first and only theatrical film The Adventures of Mark Twain.

Following his work on Return to Oz, Vinton was hired by the Disney studio to produce animation effects for their Michael Jackson Disneyland-EPCOT Center film, Captain EO in 1986 and the Speed Demon music video for Michael Jackson's musical anthology feature-length film, Moonwalker (1988).

Prominent among his hundreds of now international commercial creations were the California Raisins, the Domino's Pizza Noid, and the M&M's Red, Yellow, Blue, Green and Crispy (Orange) characters.

The California Raisins' first big hit was the song "I Heard It Through the Grapevine" in the first of their series of TV spots for the California Raisin Advisory Board. They became such a media phenomenon that they went on to star in their own pair of primetime specials for CBS television, Meet the Raisins (1988), The Raisins Sold Out (1990), and a cel-animated show, The California Raisins Show. A couple of music albums of songs from the specials, produced by Nu Shooz pop rock band leader John Smith were also released.

CBS also commissioned three more prime-time specials, Will Vinton's Claymation Christmas Celebration (1987), Claymation Comedy of Horrors (1991), and Claymation Easter (1992). Will Vinton's Claymation Christmas Celebration and Claymation Easter won a Primetime Emmy Award for Outstanding Animated Program. Claymation Comedy of Horrors was nominated for this category, but lost to The Simpsons. All were later released to video and DVD.

In the 1990s, a variety of Vinton's 400 + animators and technicians helped with new creations and films of their own using the Vinton facilities called the Walkabout Program. Craig Bartlett created his short film Arnold Escapes From Church (1988) and generated two more clay-animated short films, The Arnold Waltz (1990) and Arnold Rides a Chair (1991), each would later spawned Hey Arnold!, a cel-animated series for Nickelodeon in 1996.

Computer animation
The mid-1990s also saw Vinton adding computer animation to his output, used most visibly for his M&M's character commercials. A short CGI film, Fluffy, directed by Doug Aberle, was created during this time. Other CGI films—some combined with clay and stop-motion animation—soon followed. Vinton contributed to a consumer-grade computer animation application called Playmation, developed by Hash, Inc., a computer animation company in Vancouver, Washington. Vinton and associates also dabbled in animation for the internet with a series called Ozzie the Elf.

Switch from Claymation to Foamation
During the late 1990s and early 2000s, the Vinton Studios produced the animated series The PJs for the FOX TV network. The series was conceived and executive-produced by actor and comedian Eddie Murphy. Another animated series was produced for the UPN TV network by the Vinton studio, Gary and Mike, now a cult favorite. Gary and Mike was shot using digital video capture system developed for the production by two Vinton engineers Miegel Ginsberg and Gary McRobert. Both series used a refinement in Vinton's style of dimensional animation. Most of the clay figures were replaced by models of moulded foam rubber, eliminating many of the limitations, and maintenance issues, that are inherent with clay, which had been developed by Vinton and his technical teams as far as it could go. Vinton soon coined a new term for this process, Foamation. The studio also produced an unaired pilot for Slacker Cats in 2001.

Decline
By the end of the 1990s, the Vinton studio, seeking funds for more feature-length films, had become big enough to bring in outside investors, which included Nike, Inc., founder Phil Knight and his son, Travis, who had worked at the studio as an animator.

In spring of 2001, the studio's animated shows, The PJs and Gary and Mike were cancelled with the latter only airing 13 episodes.

In 2002, Vinton lost control of the studio he founded after Knight became the majority shareholder and Vinton failed to garner funds for further feature production in Los Angeles, eventually being dismissed from the studio. Vinton later sought damages for this and sued for ownership of his name. In 2005, Will Vinton Studios was rebranded as Laika. Premiere stop-motion animator/director Henry Selick joined the studio as a supervising director. The studio currently produces theatrical films such as Coraline, ParaNorman, The Boxtrolls, Kubo and the Two Strings, and Missing Link.

Aftermath
Vinton later founded a new production facility, Will Vinton's Free Will Entertainment, also based in Portland. In 2005, Vinton produced The Morning After, the first short film under the new company. The film combines CGI and live action. He also taught at the Portland branch of The Art Institutes and maintained an office there as an artist in residence. Vinton created a musical titled The Kiss, an adaptation of The Frog Prince with music by David Pomeranz that premiered on March 24, 2014, in Lake Oswego, Oregon. The Creative Artists Agency in Beverly Hills represented Vinton for production projects, which included a graphic novel called Jack Hightower produced in tandem with Dark Horse Comics.

Illness, retirement, and death
In 2006, Vinton was diagnosed with multiple myeloma and retired in 2008 from producing films. He died in Portland, Oregon, on October 4, 2018, after a 12-year battle from the disease at the age of 70. He was the subject of the documentary film, Claydream which was directed by Marq Evans and released at the 2021 Tribeca Film Festival.

Archive
The moving image collection of Will Vinton is housed at the Academy Film Archive. The Academy Film Archive has preserved several of Vinton's films, including Closed Mondays, The Creation, The Great Cognito, Dinosaur, Legacy, and A Christmas Gift.

Work

Feature films
 Gone for a Better Deal (1974) – director, producer (live-action documentary)
 Return to Oz (1985) – claymation director, producer (Academy Award Nominee)
 The Adventures of Mark Twain (1985) – director, producer (Comet Quest: UK: video title)
 Shadow Play (1986) – producer (live-action thriller)
 Festival of Claymation (1987) – director, producer (compilation of short films)
 Moonwalker (1988) – segment director, producer: Speed Demon by Michael Jackson
 Brain Donors (1992) – segment director (intro and outro)
 The Wild (2006) – executive producer

TV series
 The California Raisin Show, TV Series 23:00 × 13 (executive producer)
 Klay's TV, TV Series Pilot (director, executive producer)
   5 Cecille shorts for Sesame Street, 1:30 min. (producer)
 Adventures in Wonderland (Caterpillar's Stories), 4 min. × 30 (executive producer)
 Hammer Time short for Sesame Street
 The PJs, TV Series 23:00 × 52 (executive producer) Primetime Emmy Award Winner
 Boyer Brother, TV Series Pilot (executive producer)
 Gary & Mike, TV Series 23:00 × 13 (executive producer) Primetime Emmy Award Nominee
 Slacker Cats, TV Series Pilot (executive producer)

TV specials
 Will Vinton's Claymation Christmas Celebration (1987), 24 min. (director, producer) Prime-time Emmy Winner
 Meet the Raisins! (1988), 24:00 (executive producer, producer) Prime-time Emmy Nominated
 The Raisins: Sold Out! The California Raisins II (1990), 24:00 (director, producer) Prime-time Emmy Nominated
 Claymation Comedy of Horrors (1991), 24:00 (executive producer, producer) Prime-time Emmy Winner
 Claymation Easter (1992), 24:00 (executive producer, producer) Prime-time Emmy Winner

Short films
 Wobbly Wino, 2 min. (director, producer)
 Culture Shock, 17 min. (co-director, producer)
 Closed Mondays (1974), 9 min. (co-director) Academy Award Winner
 Mountain Music (1976), 9 min. (director, producer)
 Martin the Cobbler (1977), 26 min. (director, producer)
 Claymation (1978), documentary, 18 min. (director, producer)
 Rip Van Winkle (1978), 26 min. (director, producer) Academy Award Nominee
 The Little Prince (1979), 25 min. (director, producer)
 Legacy: A Very Short History of Natural Resources (1979), 7 min. (director, producer)
 Dinosaur (1980), 17 min. (director, producer)
 A Christmas Gift (1980), 7 min. (director, producer)
 Creation (1981), 7:36 (director, producer) Academy Award Nominee
 The Great Cognito (1982), 5 min. (director, producer) Academy Award Nominee
 The Diary of Adam and Eve, 24 min. (director, producer)
 Vanz Kant Danz (John Fogerty music video) (1985), 6 min. (director, producer)
 Mr. Resistor (1994), 8 min. (executive producer)
 Zerox and Mylar (1995), 5 min. (executive producer)
 Marvin the Martian in the Third Dimension (1996), 13 min. (producer)
 Bride of Resistor (1997), 6 min. (executive producer)
 The Stars Came Dreaming (1998), 12 min. (executive producer)
 Go Down Death, 10 min. (director, producer)
 The Lost 'M' Adventure (3-D short film featuring the M&M's characters) (2000), 12 min. (executive producer)
  Día de los Muertos (Day of the Dead) (2002), 8 min. (executive producer)
 The Morning After (2005), 7:30 (director, producer)
 The Martial Artist (2007), 20 min. (director, producer, writer)

Musical theatre 

 The Kiss (2014), (director, producer)

References

External links
Vinton Entertainment
Free Will Entertainment
willvinton.net, Will Vinton's Claymation and Stopmotion Animation Site

1947 births
2018 deaths
People from McMinnville, Oregon
Animators from Oregon
Directors of Best Animated Short Academy Award winners
Computer animation people
Clay animators
Film producers from Oregon
Film directors from Oregon
Deaths from multiple myeloma
Producers who won the Best Animated Short Academy Award
UC Berkeley College of Environmental Design alumni